Harry Wells may refer to:

Harry Wells (VC) (1888–1915), English soldier and Victoria Cross recipient
Harry Wells (rugby league) (born 1932), Australian rugby league footballer
Harry Wells (rugby union) (born 1993), British rugby union player
Harry Gideon Wells (1875–1943), American pathologist and immunologist
Harry Wells (Arrowverse), a character from Arrowverse franchise

See also

Harry Welles Rusk (1852–1926), U.S. Representative
Henry Wells (disambiguation)
Harold W. Wells, Massachusetts politician
Harrison Wells, a character from the Arrowverse

Harry (disambiguation)
Wells (disambiguation)